Mikhail Zhukov (born January 3, 1985 in Leningrad, Russian SFSR, Soviet Union) is a Russian professional ice hockey center who is currently an unrestricted free agent. He most recently played for Torpedo Nizhny Novgorod of the Kontinental Hockey League

Zhukov was selected by the Edmonton Oilers in the 3rd round (72nd overall) of the 2003 NHL Entry Draft.

Career statistics

References

External links

1985 births
Living people
Ak Bars Kazan players
HC CSKA Moscow players
Edmonton Oilers draft picks
HV71 players
HC Lada Togliatti players
HC Neftekhimik Nizhnekamsk players
Severstal Cherepovets players
SKA Saint Petersburg players
Ice hockey people from Saint Petersburg
HC Spartak Moscow players
Torpedo Nizhny Novgorod players
HC Vityaz players
HC Yugra players
Russian ice hockey centres